Calico Mountains Wilderness is a U S Wilderness Area in Nevada under the Bureau of Land Management. It is located in the Calico Hills.

Rockhounding, hunting, and dayhiking are in the wilderness. Photography of geologic formations and spring wildflowers is a pastime of local visitors. Box, Fly, and Cherry Creek Canyons provide a setting for day-hiking, backpacking, photography, wildlife and wild horse viewing opportunities. Hunting for mule deer, antelope, and game birds is popular in the area.

See also 
Black Rock Desert-High Rock Canyon Emigrant Trails National Conservation Area

References

External links 
Calico Mountains Wilderness page at Wilderness.net

Wilderness areas of Nevada
Protected areas of Humboldt County, Nevada
Protected areas of Pershing County, Nevada
IUCN Category Ib
Bureau of Land Management areas in Nevada